Listen to Your Heart is a 2010 romantic drama written by Kent Moran and produced by Kent Moran and Luke Moran and directed by Matt Thompson.

Plot
Struggling musician Danny Foster (Kent Moran) never dreamed he'd fall in love with a woman who couldn't hear his compositions. But when he meets Ariana Scott (Alexia Rasmussen), a privileged girl who lost her hearing in childhood, he's willing to believe anything's possible. As the young couple's love takes hold, however, Ariana's overbearing mother (Cybill Shepherd) proves to be their most vocal critic.

Cast
 Alexia Rasmussen as Ariana "Sam"
 Kent Moran as Danny Foster
 Cybill Shepherd as Victoria Scott
 Frank Watson as Roger
 Ernie Sabella as Tony
 Lisa Benner as Marianne
 Amy Lockwood as Nicole
 Robert Ousley as George
 Luke Moran as Mitch
 Shirley Knight as Grandma Sam

Official Festival Selections
 Rhode Island International Film Festival
 Action On Film International Film Festival (Pasadena, California)
 New York City International Film Festival
 Beverly Hills Film, TV, and New Media Festival
 Offshoot Film Festival (Arkansas)
 North Country Film Festival (New Hampshire)
 Temecula Valley International Film Festival (California)
 Salem Film Festival (Salem, Massachusetts)
 Fort Lauderdale International Film Festival (Fort Lauderdale, Florida)
 Los Angeles Cinema Festival of Hollywood (California)
 Daytona Beach Film Festival (Florida)
 Amelia Island Film Festival (Florida)
 Fallbrook Film Festival (Bonsall, California)
 Lake Arrowhead Film Festival (Blue Jay, California)

Awards
 Winner - Best Drama at the Salem Film Festival
 Winner - Best Narrative Feature (Merit Award) at the Los Angeles Cinema Festival of Hollywood
 Winner - Best Overall Film at the Offshoot Film Festival
 Winner - Best Picture at the Action on Film International Film Festival
 Winner - Audience Award at the Amelia Island Film Festival
 Winner - Audience Award at the Daytona Beach Film Festival
 Winner - Audience Award at the Fallbrook Film Festival
 Winner - Audience Award at the Fort Lauderdale International Film Festival
 Winner - Audience Award at the North Country Film Festival
 Winner - Audience Award for Best Feature at the Rhode Island International Film Festival
 Winner - Audience Award at the Temecula Valley International Film Festival
 Winner - People's Choice at the New York City International Film Festival
 Winner - Best Director at the Beverly Hills Film, TV, and New Media Festival
 Winner - Screenwriting (Alan J. Bailey Award) at the Action on Film International Film Festival
 Winner - Best Actress (Alexia Rasmussen) at the Los Angeles Cinema Festival of Hollywood
 Winner - Best Supporting Actress (Cybill Shepherd) at the Los Angeles Cinema Festival of Hollywood
 Winner - Music and the Magic of Movies Award at the Lake Arrowhead Film Festival
 Winner - Best Art Direction at the Action on Film International Film Festival
 Nominated - Best Actor (Kent Moran) – New York City International Film Festival
 Nominated - Best Actress (Alexia Rasmussen) – Action on Film International Film Festival
 Nominated - Best Supporting Actress (Cybill Shepherd) – Action on Film International Film Festival
 Nominated - Best Produced Screenplay – Action on Film International Film Festival
 Nominated - Best New Writer (Kent Moran) – Withoutabox Written Word Award

News References
 http://bonsallchamber.org/event-620078
 http://villagenews.com/local/free-screening-of-film-listen-to-your-heart/
 http://www.film-festival.org/award10.php
 http://www.salemfilmfestival.com/2010/films/features/listentoyourheart.html
 http://www.whittierdailynews.com/article/ZZ/20110412/NEWS/110417428
 http://www.mountain-news.com/mountain_living/article_f5c8b460-6639-11e0-afba-001cc4c03286.html

References

External links
 
 
 

American Sign Language films
2010 romantic drama films
2010 films
American romantic drama films
Films shot in New York City
Films shot in Connecticut
2010s English-language films
2010s American films